Hector the Mighty is a 1972 Italian comedy film directed by Enzo G. Castellari. A parody of Homer's Iliad set in modern times, it is loosely based on the 1966 novel Le roi des Mirmidous by Henri Viard and Bernard Zacharias.

Italian horror film director Lucio Fulci co-wrote the screenplay. Producer Edmondo Amati wanted Fulci to direct it, but Fulci thought it was an inferior project and was able to get out of doing it, even though he was under contract to Amati at the time.

Plot
A pimp named Horny Hector operates a brothel on property coveted by Cardinal Giove. The Cardinal comes up with a plan to force Hector into selling him the land by kidnapping Helen (an updating of the Helen of Troy story), triggering a small gang war.

Cast 
 Vittorio Caprioli as Menelaus
 Michael Forest as  Achilles
 Giancarlo Giannini as  Ulysses 
 Juan Luis Galiardo as   Paris
 Rosanna Schiaffino as  Helen
 Philippe Leroy as  Hector 
 Aldo Giuffrè as  Agamemnon
 Luciano Salce as  Count Mercury
 Vittorio De Sica as  Cardinal Jove
 Haydée Politoff as  Chryseis
 Orchidea De Santis as Briseis
 Giancarlo Prete as  Patroclus, aka Clò-Clò
 Franca Valeri as  Cassandra
 Gianrico Tedeschi as  Priam 
 Caterina Boratto as Hecuba 
 Gigi Rizzi as  Polites
 José Calvo as  The Lawyer

References

External links

1972 comedy films
1972 films
1970s crime comedy films
1970s parody films
Films directed by Enzo G. Castellari
Italian parody films
Trojan War films
Films based on adaptations
Films based on the Iliad
Films scored by Francesco De Masi
Italian crime comedy films
Modern adaptations of the Iliad
Films about prostitution in Italy
1970s Italian films